AT&T SportsNet Pittsburgh is an American regional sports network owned by Warner Bros. Discovery through its sports unit as part of the AT&T SportsNet brand of networks. Headquartered in Pittsburgh, the channel broadcasts local coverage of sports events throughout Greater Pittsburgh and western Pennsylvania, as well as national programs from Bally Sports including college sports, and magazine, entertainment and documentary programs. It is the exclusive home of the Pittsburgh Pirates and Pittsburgh Penguins.

, AT&T SportsNet Pittsburgh is available on cable providers throughout nearly all of Pennsylvania (outside the Philadelphia market), almost all of West Virginia, western Maryland, eastern Ohio, southwestern border areas of New York and Ashland, Kentucky, reaching more than 2.4 million homes; it is also available in the Columbus, Ohio market through DirecTV Stream, though Penguins broadcasts are blacked out due to the presence of the Columbus Blue Jackets. It is also available nationwide on satellite via DirecTV.

History
The channel launched on April 13, 1986, as Pirates Cable Network, exclusively serving the Pittsburgh metropolitan area; its first sports event telecast on that date was a Major League Baseball game between the Pittsburgh Pirates and Chicago Cubs from Three Rivers Stadium, announced by Mike Lange, in which the Pirates shut out the Cubs, 8–0.

The network commenced full-time broadcasts on April 24, 1986, as the KBL Entertainment Network, in order to allow other sports besides the Pirates to be included on the network. Its first regular broadcast was a Pirates home game against the New York Mets. The network was initially owned by Tele-Communications Inc. (now part of Comcast), then the largest cable television provider in the Pittsburgh market. KBL quickly expanded its cable coverage. As early as May 9, 1986; its cable footprint roughly approximated its present six-state coverage area.

While it primarily carried sports-related programming, KBL also served as a general entertainment cable channel while under TCI ownership, essentially filling the void left after independent station WPGH-TV (channel 53) became a charter affiliate of the Fox Broadcasting Company seven months after KBL's debut. It aired children's programming for part of the day, including reruns of the John Candy animated series Camp Candy.

In 1994, TCI transferred the channel to its corporate parent Liberty Media; KBL then immediately dropped all entertainment programming and converted the renamed Prime Sports KBL into an affiliate of Prime SportsChannel America, a partnership between Liberty's Prime Network and the Cablevision/NBC-owned SportsChannel America regional sports network groups. In 1995, Prime Network's retail subsidiary, Prime Sports Merchandising, purchased some sports apparel stores located inside shopping malls and rebranded them as Prime Sports Shops, promoting them on its networks including KBL.

In 1996, News Corporation, which formed a sports division for the Fox network two years earlier after it obtained the broadcast rights to the National Football Conference and sought to create a group of regional sports networks, acquired a 50% interest in the Prime Network from TCI parent Liberty Media. Later that year on November 1, News Corporation and Liberty Media relaunched the Prime Network affiliates as part of the new Fox Sports Net group, with Prime Sports KBL officially rebranding as Fox Sports Pittsburgh. The deal temporarily ended the Prime SportsChannel partnership, although News Corporation subsequently acquired most of the SportsChannel networks the following year; the retail stores, meanwhile, retained the "Prime Sports" name for many years after the rebranding of the regional networks as part of Fox Sports Net. The channel was rebranded as Fox Sports Net Pittsburgh in 2000, as part of a collective brand modification of the FSN networks under the "Fox Sports Net" banner; subsequently in 2004, the channel shortened its name to FSN Pittsburgh, through the networks' de-emphasis of the "Fox Sports Net" brand.

On December 22, 2006, News Corporation sold its interest in FSN Pittsburgh and sister networks FSN Utah, FSN Northwest and FSN Rocky Mountain to Liberty Media, in an asset trade in which News Corporation also traded its 38.5% ownership stake in satellite provider DirecTV for $550 million in cash and stock, in exchange for Liberty Media's 16.3% stake in the company. On May 4, 2009, DirecTV Group Inc. announced it would become a part of Liberty's entertainment unit, part of which would then be spun off into the separate company under the DirecTV name, in a deal in which Liberty would increase its share in DirecTV from 48% to 54%, with Liberty owner John Malone and his family owning a 24% interest. DirecTV would operate its newly acquired FSN-affiliated networks through DirecTV Sports Networks, a new division formed when the split off from Liberty Media was completed on November 19, 2009.

On December 17, 2010, DirecTV Sports Networks announced that its four Fox Sports Networks-affiliated regional outlets would be relaunched under the "Root Sports" brand. The network officially rebranded as Root Sports Pittsburgh on April 1, 2011, coinciding with the start of the 2011 Major League Baseball season. For nominal purposes, the Root Sports networks continued to carry programming distributed mainly to the Fox Sports regional networks to provide supplementary sports and entertainment programming. On April 8, 2016, DirecTV Sports Networks rebranded under the AT&T name as AT&T Sports Networks.

On June 12, 2017, AT&T Sports Networks announced that the network, along with Root Sports Southwest, and Root Sports Rocky Mountain, would rebrand as AT&T SportsNet with the channel becoming AT&T SportsNet Pittsburgh. All network programming and on-air talent remained intact, with the exception of Paul Steigerwald, who was replaced in October 2017 by Steve Mears as the play-by-play announcer of the Penguins. The name change took effect on July 14, 2017.

Possible sale
On April 26, 2019, it was reported that Sinclair Broadcast Group (owners of WPGH-TV & WPNT in Pittsburgh, as well as other stations throughout the channel's coverage area) was the successful bidder of the Fox Sports Networks that were required to be divested as a condition of The Walt Disney Company's acquisition of much of 21st Century Fox. While it wouldn't directly affect AT&T SportsNet Pittsburgh, it is not known if Sinclair would keep the Fox Sports Networks programming (presumably to be merged into Stadium) on the channel or move it to Sinclair's over-the-air properties. Within AT&T SportsNet Pittsburgh's viewing area, Sinclair either owns or operates WPGH-TV/WPNT in Pittsburgh, WHP-TV/WXBU in Harrisburg, Pennsylvania, WCHS-TV/WVAH-TV in Charleston/Huntington, West Virginia, WJAC-TV/WWCP-TV/WATM-TV in Johnstown/Altoona/State College, Pennsylvania, WOLF-TV/WQMY/WSWB in Scranton/Wilkes-Barre, Pennsylvania, and WTOV-TV in Steubenville, Ohio.

In July 2019, it was reported that AT&T was looking to sell AT&T SportsNet to reduce debt related to its acquisition of Time Warner as well as rolling out 5G on its cell phone networks. Following Sinclair's closure of its purchase of the Fox Sports Networks, it was reported that Sinclair and Comcast (the latter of which owns NBC Sports Regional Networks) could purchase AT&T Sports Networks. Such deals could reunite AT&T SportsNet Pittsburgh with its former Fox Sports Network siblings through Sinclair or reunite it with TCI successor Comcast; the former would also make it a sister network to WPGH-TV/WPNT while the latter would make it a partial sister network with the Pittsburgh Cable News Channel co-owned between Comcast and WPXI.

On October 1, 2021, AT&T SportsNet Pittsburgh, along with sister networks AT&T SportsNet Rocky Mountain, and Root Sports Northwest, was removed from Dish Network satellite and Sling streaming TV services.

Programming
AT&T SportsNet Pittsburgh carries more than 350 live sports events annually (all of which are also available in high definition), featuring a mix of professional, collegiate and high school sports. To fill out its schedule outside various local sports, the network also carries syndicated sports events, documentary and magazine programs including outdoor programming, pro footvolley, kickboxing, poker, MMA, boxing, golf programming, Sports Stars of Tomorrow and In Depth with Graham Bensinger.

Professional sports

Pittsburgh Pirates
The network holds the regional cable television rights to the Pittsburgh Pirates of Major League Baseball, carrying over 150 regular season and Spring training games annually, as well as rebroadcasts of recent games (as part of Pirates Instant Replay) and the team analysis program Inside Pirates Baseball presented by Allegheny Health Network.

From the 2013 to 2018 seasons, AT&T's telecasts of Pirates games were blacked out on DirecTV in many portions of the Pirates' claimed territory, including the Columbus, Ohio market, for reasons not released publicly. Despite the blackout, DirecTV did not allow Pirates games to be shown in the blacked-out area on its MLB Extra Innings package. The blackout was lifted in time for the 2019 season.

Pittsburgh Penguins

AT&T SportsNet also maintains exclusive regional rights to most regular season and any early-round Stanley Cup playoff games involving the NHL's Pittsburgh Penguins; it also carries Penguins-related programs such as Penguins Instant Replay, Inside Penguins Hockey, Pens Pulse, and In The Room.

On April 27, 2011, the network reached a contract extension with the Penguins, allowing the network to continue carrying most of the team's NHL game telecasts through the end of the 2028–29 NHL season.

Pittsburgh Steelers
The network formerly served as the cable home of the NFL's Pittsburgh Steelers, broadcasting team-related magazine and analysis programs such as weekly press conferences held by coach Mike Tomlin during the regular season and the team coach's show The Mike Tomlin Show (both were hosted by Stan Savran). This continued through the 2016 season. KDKA-TV now airs The Mike Tomlin Show, while Tomlin's Tuesday press conference is no longer televised live. Although regular Steelers coverage is no longer part of the network’s lineup, team documentary programming continues to air from time to time, usually focused on historical figures such as Art Rooney and Chuck Noll.

Minor league sports

Wilkes-Barre/Scranton Penguins
The network currently serves as the cable home of the AHL's Wilkes-Barre/Scranton Penguins, broadcasting weekend home games during the regular season. Prior to the network acquiring the rights to the games, the team had no television coverage in either Pittsburgh's or Wilkes-Barre's DMAs.

College sports

Current Programming 

Select football and basketball games from the Division 2 Mountain East Conference are occasionally aired, the most recent of which being a football contest between Fairmont State and Frostburg State in October 2022. Occasionally, the network will pick up football and basketball games aired by its 3 sister networks, including basketball from the West Coast Conference and Mountain West Conference and football from the Southwestern Athletic Conference. Additionally, the network airs insider programming featuring the Penn State Nittany Lions, Notre Dame Fighting Irish, West Virginia Mountaineers, and Duquesne Dukes.

West Virginia Mountaineers 
AT&T SportsNet Pittsburgh formerly carried the exclusive rights to the West Virginia Mountaineers, carrying all football and men's basketball games not picked up by a national network, as well as select women's basketball games, select other live events (women's soccer, baseball, etc.), and the football team's weekly Tuesday press conferences. Although the network lost rights to the live events portion of their WVU coverage to ESPN+ beginning with the 2020-2021 season, a coaches show involving all Mountaineer sports and Mountaineer Gameday, a live pregame show for Mountaineer football and men’s basketball, still air on the channel.

Pittsburgh Panthers 
The network formerly carried football, men's and women's basketball, and other events featuring the Pittsburgh Panthers, which were produced first by ESPN Regional Television and later by Fox Sports South and Raycom Sports once the Panthers moved to the ACC. Additionally, the network aired a number of Panthers-related insider programming, including Pat Narduzzi’s weekly press conferences, The Pat Narduzzi Show with Larry Richert, and the magazine program Beyond The Script, which was hosted by the network’s Rob King. The partnership ended following the 2020-21 athletic year.

Duquesne Dukes 
The network has served as the regional home of Duquesne Dukes men’s and women’s basketball several times throughout its 30+-year history, the most recent of which lasted for 2 seasons between 2017 and 2019. As of August 2019, these rights have been moved to the streaming service ESPN+, although a weekly coaches show still airs on the network.

High school & youth sports
West Virginia Secondary School Activities Commission high school football, baseball, softball, and boys' and girls' basketball championship games, as well as occasional broadcasts of regular-season WVSSAC football contests, are carried by AT&T SportsNet Pittsburgh.

The network is the regional home of the annual PONY League World Series, which is held locally in Washington County, Pennsylvania. Former Pirates' play-by-play announcer Lanny Frattare calls most games.

Until 2019, Western Pennsylvania Interscholastic Athletic League regular season, playoff, and championship football games were a network staple. WPCW-TV took over the rights to all 6 championship games in 2018, and the rights to additional playoff and regular season games in 2019.

Studio Programming
The network provides live pre- and postgame coverage of all Penguins and Pirates games it airs. Usually, these shows last between 30 minutes to an hour and are produced from the network’s studios for away games and on-location (PPG Paints Arena or PNC Park) for home games. However, the network does not provide this coverage for playoff games (other than the first round of the NHL Stanley Cup Playoffs) or regular season games aired nationally, making the station one of few regional sports networks in the country whose team studio coverage is limited to only the games it produces.

Since 2021, AT&T SportsNet has served as the local affiliate of VSIN's Follow The Money, a 3-hour sports betting program that airs weekdays from noon-3pm. Previously, the network aired simulcasts of Audience Network's The Rich Eisen Show and The Dan Patrick Show in this time slot.

Throughout the previous 2 decades, locally-produced studio programming has been drastically reduced from nightly programs to pre- and postgame coverage only. Savran on SportsBeat, Pittsburgh Sports Tonight, and live Steelers coverage are just some of the local studio shows that were cancelled during the network’s ownership under Liberty Media in the late 2000s. Nationally-distributed Fox Sports studio shows also aired in both live and tape-delay until they were moved to Fox Sports 1 upon its 2013 launch.

On-air staff

Current on-air staff

Pittsburgh Penguins
 Steve Mears - play-by-play announcer
 Bob Errey - color commentator
 Dan Potash - rinkside reporter
 Rob King - studio host
 Jay Caufield - studio analyst
 Colby Armstrong - studio analyst

Pittsburgh Pirates
 Greg Brown – play-by-play announcer
 Joe Block - play-by-play announcer
 John Wehner - color commentator
 Bob Walk - color commentator
 Neil Walker - color commentator
 Kevin Young - color commentator
 Matt Capps - color commentator
 Michael McKenry - color commentator and studio analyst
 Robby Incmikoski - field reporter
 Stan Savran - studio host
 Aly Cohen - studio host

Studio Anchors
 Rob King (also serves as play-by-play announcer for WVU football and basketball)
 Stan Savran
 Aly Cohen (mostly during Pirates broadcasts)

Notable former on-air staff
 Paul Alexander – studio anchor and sideline reporter
 Warren Baker – WVU men's basketball color commentator, now with ESPN+
 Steve Blass – Pittsburgh Pirates color commentator (retired after 2019 Pirates' season)
 Mark Bulger – WVU football color commentator
 Meg Bulger – WVU football sideline reporter
 Ryan Burr – now with the Golf Channel
 Ellis Cannon – Duquesne basketball color commentator
 Trenni Casey – now with NBC Sports Boston
 Lacee Collins – sideline reporter for the Pittsburgh Pirates and other events
 Lanny Frattare – Pittsburgh Pirates' play-by-play (semi-retired, currently the play-by-play announcer for PONY League World Series telecasts)
 Marshall Harris – now with WBBM-TV in Chicago
 Guy Junker – co-host of SportsBeat (later with WTAE-TV; now retired from Television)
 Mike Lange – Pittsburgh Penguins play-by-play (later with the Pittsburgh Penguins Radio Network) (now retired)
 Mike Logan – WVU football color commentator
 Rasheed Marshall –  WVU football color commentator
 Tim Neverett – Pittsburgh Pirates and college basketball play-by-play (now with the Los Angeles Dodgers)
 Eddie Olczyk – Pittsburgh Penguins color commentator (now with NHL on TNT and Root Sports Northwest)
 Pat Parris – Pittsburgh Penguins sideline reporter, studio anchor (now with Fox Sports Midwest)
 Mike Rupp - Pittsburgh Penguins' studio analyst (now with NHL Network)
 Chris Schneider – high school football analyst
 Paul Steigerwald – Pittsburgh Penguins play-by-play (now with the communications and marketing department of the Penguins' front office)
 Brent Stover – now with Big Ten Network
 Peter Taglianetti – Pittsburgh Penguins color commentator
 Josh Taylor - Duquesne basketball play-by-play
 Kent Tekulve – Pittsburgh Pirates' studio analyst (retired after 2017 Pirates' season)
 Rich Walsh – sideline reporter (now with KDKA-TV)
Craig Wolfley – high school football and Steelers analyst (now with Pittsburgh Steelers Radio Network)

References

External links

 

AT&T SportsNet
Television stations in Pittsburgh
Bally Sports
SportsChannel
Prime Sports
Former Liberty Media subsidiaries
Television channels and stations established in 1986
Cable television in the United States
Fox Sports Networks
1986 establishments in Pennsylvania
Turner Sports